A Meteor Ireland Music Award was an accolade bestowed upon professionals in the music industry in Ireland and further afield. They had been bestowed each year since 2001, replacing the IRMA Ireland Music Awards held in the 1990s. Promoted by MCD Productions, the ceremony at which these accolades were bestowed upon worthy recipients was referred to colloquially as The Meteors, though occasionally also by its full title.

Event organisers confirmed in January 2011 that there would be no awards ceremony that year, with Meteor's cancellation of its sponsorship of the event widely blamed for this abrupt occurrence.

History
The Meteor Ireland Music Awards were the equivalent to the Canada's Juno Awards, the United States Grammy Awards, the Echo Awards in Germany and the United Kingdom's BRIT Awards. The awards take their name from their sponsors, Meteor.

Each year there was a mix of live performances and award presentations at a ceremony conducted in the Point Theatre, Dublin (2001–2007) and the RDS, Dublin (2008–present). Irish artists to have showcased their music included Snow Patrol, Sinéad O'Connor, U2, Bell X1, Aslan, Westlife, The Blizzards, The Frames, The Coronas, Director, Hothouse Flowers, Cathy Davey, The Devlins, The Thrills, Paddy Casey and The Immediate, whilst previous live performances by international artists have included the Pussycat Dolls, Amy Winehouse, Sugababes, Counting Crows, The Darkness, Kaiser Chiefs, Lionel Richie and Tom Jones.

Those to have presented awards to recipients included both Irish and international figures from music, sport, film, television and beauty, such as Joe Elliott, Denis Hickie, Colin Farrell, Alex Zane and Rosanna Davison. The award ceremony had been hosted by a number of different personalities throughout its history; these included Ed Byrne, Patrick Kielty, Amanda Byram, Podge and Rodge alongside Deirdre O'Kane and Dara Ó Briain, who has performed the role on at least three occasions, most recently in 2008.

Originally held in the Point Theatre in Dublin, in 2008 the award ceremony moved to the RDS Simmonscourt of the Royal Dublin Society until its end in 2011.

Past awards
 Meteor Ireland Music Awards 2010
 Meteor Ireland Music Awards 2009
 Meteor Ireland Music Awards 2008
 Meteor Ireland Music Awards 2007
 Meteor Ireland Music Awards 2006
 Meteor Ireland Music Awards 2005
 Meteor Ireland Music Awards 2004
 Meteor Ireland Music Awards 2003

Recipients by year
A list of winners is to be found on the Meteor website.

Irish awards

International awards

Award ceremonies by year

References

External links

 
 Site of MCD – awards promoters
 List of winners through the years
 Highlights of 2006 Awards sponsored by eircom
 Photos (2002 awards) at ShowBiz Ireland

 
2000s in Irish music
2010s in Irish music
Awards established in 2001
Awards disestablished in 2010
Irish music awards